Rosaura Sánchez (born December 6, 1941) is a writer, storyteller, linguist and critic. Sánchez' "most singular and significant contribution to this field [Chicano bilingualism] is the formulation of a theoretical framework for the analysis of Chicano Spanish based on the premise that Spanish use in America must be considered in its social and verbal interactions." As an editor, one of her most relevant works was the novel Who Would Have Thought it? (1995) by writer María Amparo Ruiz de Burton of California, published by the Arte Público Press in Houston, Texas.

Biography
Sánchez was born in San Angelo, Texas. She earned undergraduate and master's degrees in Spanish literature from the University of Texas at Austin in 1963 and 1969, respectively. She earned a doctorate in Romance languages from the same university in 1974. Her doctoral dissertation was titled "A Generative Study of Two Spanish Dialects". At one point during her studies, Sánchez joined the Peace Corps and spent several years in Ecuador with the organization.

While a graduate student, Sánchez published "Nuestra circunstancia lingüística," an influential description of rural and urban varieties of Chicano Spanish.

Sánchez was a literature professor at the University of California, San Diego.

Works
As author

As editor

References 

1941 births
People from San Angelo, Texas
University of California, San Diego faculty
University of Texas at Austin College of Liberal Arts alumni
Hispanic and Latino American writers
American literary critics
Women literary critics
Living people
American women critics